Troianata is a village and a community in the municipal unit of Argostoli, on the island of Cephalonia, Greece. The community consists of the villages Troianata (population 98 in 2011), Demoutsantata (pop. 109) and Mitakata (pop. 16). Troianata is situated on a hillside, at about 300 m elevation. It is 3 km north of Peratata, 3 km southwest of Valsamata and 6 km southeast of Argostoli. Troianata suffered great damage from the 1953 Ionian earthquake.

Historical population

See also

List of settlements in Cephalonia

References

Populated places in Cephalonia